In the 2011–12 season, Espérance Sportive de Tunis competed in the Ligue 1 for the 58th season, as well as the Tunisian Cup.  It was their 58th consecutive season in the top flight of Tunisian football. They competed in Ligue 1, the Champions League, the FIFA Club World Cup and the CAF Super Cup.

Squad list
Players and squad numbers last updated on 18 November 2011.Note: Flags indicate national team as has been defined under FIFA eligibility rules. Players may hold more than one non-FIFA nationality.

Competitions

Overview

{| class="wikitable" style="text-align: center"
|-
!rowspan=2|Competition
!colspan=8|Record
!rowspan=2|Started round
!rowspan=2|Final position / round
!rowspan=2|First match	
!rowspan=2|Last match
|-
!
!
!
!
!
!
!
!
|-
| Ligue 1

|  
| style="background:gold;"| Winners
| 15 November 2011
| 17 May 2012
|-
| Tunisian Cup

| Round of 32
| Semi-finals
| 20 June 2013
| 29 June 2013
|-
| CAF Super Cup

| Final
| style="background:silver;"| Runners–up
| colspan=2| 25 February 2012
|-
| 2011 Champions League

| Group stage 
| style="background:gold;"| Winners
| 16 July 2011
| 12 November 2011
|-
| 2012 Champions League

| First round
| Second round
| 24 March 2012	
| 13 May 2012
|-
| FIFA Club World Cup

| Quarter-finals
| Fifth place
| 11 December 2011
| 14 December 2011
|-
! Total

Ligue 1

League table

Results summary

Results by round

Matches

Tunisian Cup

2011 Champions League

Group stage

Group B

knockout stage

Semi-finals

Final

CAF Super Cup

FIFA Club World Cup

2012 Champions League

First round

Second round

Squad information

Playing statistics

|-
! colspan=14 style=background:#dcdcdc; text-align:center| Goalkeepers

|-
! colspan=14 style=background:#dcdcdc; text-align:center| Defenders

|-
! colspan=14 style=background:#dcdcdc; text-align:center| Midfielders

|-
! colspan=14 style=background:#dcdcdc; text-align:center| Forwards

|-
! colspan=14 style=background:#dcdcdc; text-align:center| Players transferred out during the season

Goalscorers
Includes all competitive matches. The list is sorted alphabetically by surname when total goals are equal.

Transfers

In

Out

References 

2011-12
Tunisian football clubs 2011–12 season